Swapnil Gugale (born 4 April 1991) is an Indian first-class cricketer who plays for Maharashtra. In October 2016 during the 2016–17 Ranji Trophy, he scored 351 runs not out in a match between Maharashtra and Delhi. In the match he made a 594 run partnership with Ankit Bawne, the second-highest partnership in first-class cricket and the highest partnership in the history of the Ranji Trophy.

See also
 List of Ranji Trophy triple centuries

References

External links
 

1991 births
Living people
Indian cricketers
Maharashtra cricketers
Cricketers from Pune